Laird is a village in the Canadian province of Saskatchewan within the Rural Municipality of Laird No. 404 and Census Division No. 15. Laird is located in the Saskatchewan River Valley. The village is named after David Laird, Lieutenant Governor of the Northwest Territories.

History 

Laird sits on the Stoney Knoll First Nation, a former Indian reserve that was cleared by the government and terminated in 1897. Local community members have been instrumental in supporting a specific land claim filed by Stoney Knoll descendants. Laird incorporated as a village on May 4, 1911.

Demographics 

See also 

 List of communities in Saskatchewan
 Villages of Saskatchewan

References

External links
Saskatchewan City & Town Maps
Saskatchewan Gen Web - One Room School Project 
Post Offices and Postmasters - ArchiviaNet - Library and Archives Canada
Saskatchewan Gen Web Region
Online Historical Map Digitization Project
GeoNames Query 
2006 Community Profiles

Villages in Saskatchewan
Rosthern No. 403, Saskatchewan
Division No. 15, Saskatchewan